Gott is a surname. Notable people with the name include:

 Benjamin Gott (1762–1840), British textile manufacturer
 Daniel Gott (1794–1864), U.S. Representative from New York
 Henry Gott (1730-1809), British gardener
 Jackson C. Gott (1829-1909), U.S. architect
 Jim Gott (born 1959), U.S. baseball player
 John Gott (bishop) (1830-1906) Vicar of Leeds and Bishop of Truro
 J. Richard Gott (born 1947), U.S. astrophysicist
 John William Gott (1866–1922), the last person in Britain to be sent to prison for blasphemy
 Karel Gott (1939–2019), Czech singer
 Larry Gott (born 1957), British musician
 Merryn Gott New Zealand nursing academic specialising in palliative care
 Richard Gott (born 1938), British journalist and historian
 Samuel Gott (1614–1671), MP for Winchelsea
 Trevor Gott, baseball player
 William Gott (1897–1942), known as "Strafer", British General of the Second World War in the Middle East
 William Gott (philanthropist) (1797–1863), British wool merchant and philanthropist

See also
 Gotts, a surname